P. ovata  may refer to:
 Phymorhynchus ovata, a sea snail species
 Pineda ovata, a flowering plant species native to the Andes of Bolivia
 Plantago ovata (also Psyllium ovata), the desert indianwheat, a medicinal plant species native to Western Asia and Southern Asia

See also